Newt is a shortened form of the given name Newton. It may refer to:

People
 Newt Allen (1901–1988), American Negro league baseball player
 Newt Gingrich (born 1943), American politician and former Speaker of the House
 Newt H. Hall (1873–1939), American Marine Corps officer who served during the Boxer Rebellion
 Newt Heisley (1920–2009), American commercial artist who designed the POW/MIA flag
 Newt Hudson (1926-2014), American politician and educator
 Newt Hunter (1880–1963), American Major League Baseball player
 Newt Joseph (1896-1953), American Negro league baseball player and manager
 Newt Kimball (1915-2001), American Major League Baseball pitcher
 Newt Loken (1919-2011), American gymnast and coach
 Newt V. Mills (1899–1996), American politician
 Newt Perry (1908-1987), American swimmer, coach and promoter of water theme parks
 Newt Randall (1880–1955), American Major League Baseball player

Fictional characters
 Newt Dobbs, in the Western novel Lonesome Dove, the miniseries adaptation, and the sequel miniseries, Return to Lonesome Dove
 Rebecca "Newt" Jorden, in the film Aliens
 Newt Livingston from Cory in the House
 Oswald "Uncle Newt" Nightingale, one of the central characters in the ninth series of John Finnemore's Souvenir Programme
 Newt Scamander, the fictional author of J. K. Rowling's 2001 book Fantastic Beasts and Where to Find Them
 Newt, a character in Hollyoaks
 Newt, in the novel The Maze Runner, the two sequels and the film trilogy based on them
 Newt, a character from Xenoblade Chronicles 2

See also
Newt (disambiguation)

English masculine given names
Hypocorisms
Lists of people by nickname